Gabriel Francisco García de la Torre (born 10 February 1979), known as Gabri, is a Spanish retired footballer, currently a manager. Mainly a midfielder who could play in the right or the middle, he could also appear as an attacking right-back.

He spent seven years of his professional career with Barcelona (13 counting youth teams), winning four major titles but almost exclusively as a backup. He also played four seasons with Ajax.

Gabri represented Spain at Euro 2004.

Club career

Barcelona
Born in Sallent de Llobregat, Barcelona, Catalonia, Gabri started his professional career at FC Barcelona's reserves, where he made his first appearances in the 1997–98 season whilst they competed in the Segunda División B. He scored four goals in 28 games en route to promotion, including once in a 5–0 home win against Real Madrid Castilla in the playoffs.

Gabri was promoted to the main squad for the 1999–2000 campaign, and in the following four years he was a regular but, subsequently and during the team's conquests in 2005–06 (for an eventual total of two La Liga championships, one Supercopa de España and the 2005–06 UEFA Champions League), would feature less significantly; he was also severely injured during the 2004–05 season, after a 4–1 home victory over Real Zaragoza.

Ajax
Gabri's contract at Barcelona was not renewed, and he joined AFC Ajax on a free transfer on 6 June 2006, alongside former teammate Roger García. There, he immediately won the Johan Cruyff Shield in a 3–1 defeat of PSV Eindhoven in August, and was also a key element in a side that lost the lost the Eredivisie on the last matchday, to the same opposition.

In May 2007, Gabri won the KNVB Cup on penalties against AZ Alkmaar, in a match where he received a red card in the 79th minute. In August, Ajax successfully defended their Supercup title by beating PSV again, with him as the only goalscorer in the match.

Later years
On 27 May 2010, after a last poor individual season with Ajax – only 13 matches, even though the Amsterdam side finished in second place – the 31-year-old Gabri signed for Qatar Stars League club Umm-Salal Sports Club. On 4 July of the following year he moved countries again, joining FC Sion in Switzerland.

On 25 July 2012, having taken almost no part in the Super League campaign, Gabri changed teams but stayed in the country, agreeing to a contract at FC Lausanne-Sport. He retired two years later at the age of 35, and immediately returned to Barcelona as assistant to their reserves.

Coaching
In July 2015, as part of a reshuffle by incoming director José Segura, Gabri changed roles within the club, becoming the coach of the Juvenil A youth team. On 25 October 2017, he was appointed manager at Sion and, in December of the following year, he signed with FC Andorra in the same capacity. On 24 February 2020, after three consecutive losses and seven matches without a win, he was dismissed.

Remaining in the third tier, Gabri managed UE Olot from January to April 2021, leaving by mutual consent. On 1 June that year, he signed for Lleida Esportiu for the next three seasons.

Gabri replaced Pedro Munitis at the helm of CE Sabadell FC in the Primera Federación in July 2022.

International career
Gabri was a key element in Spain's squad at the 1999 FIFA World Youth Championship, scoring three goals to become World Champion of the category. He was also a member of the national team at the 2000 Summer Olympics in Sydney.

After making his full debut on 30 April 2003 in a friendly with Ecuador, Gabri went on to represent the nation at UEFA Euro 2004 in Portugal, not leaving the bench in an eventual group-stage exit.

Managerial statistics

Honours
Barcelona
La Liga: 2004–05, 2005–06
Supercopa de España: 2005
UEFA Champions League: 2005–06

Ajax
KNVB Cup: 2006–07, 2009–10
Johan Cruyff Shield: 2006, 2007

Spain U20
FIFA World Youth Championship: 1999

Spain U23
Summer Olympics silver medal: 2000

References

External links

Stats at Voetbal International 

1979 births
Living people
People from Bages
Sportspeople from the Province of Barcelona
Spanish footballers
Footballers from Catalonia
Association football midfielders
Association football utility players
La Liga players
Segunda División players
Segunda División B players
FC Barcelona Atlètic players
FC Barcelona players
Eredivisie players
AFC Ajax players
Qatar Stars League players
Umm Salal SC players
Swiss Super League players
FC Sion players
FC Lausanne-Sport players
UEFA Champions League winning players
Spain youth international footballers
Spain under-21 international footballers
Spain under-23 international footballers
Spain international footballers
UEFA Euro 2004 players
Olympic footballers of Spain
Footballers at the 2000 Summer Olympics
Olympic silver medalists for Spain
Olympic medalists in football
Medalists at the 2000 Summer Olympics
Catalonia international footballers
Spanish expatriate footballers
Expatriate footballers in the Netherlands
Expatriate footballers in Qatar
Expatriate footballers in Switzerland
Spanish expatriate sportspeople in the Netherlands
Spanish expatriate sportspeople in Qatar
Spanish expatriate sportspeople in Switzerland
Spanish football managers
Swiss Super League managers
FC Sion managers
Segunda División B managers
Primera Federación managers
Segunda Federación managers
FC Andorra managers
UE Olot managers
Lleida Esportiu managers
CE Sabadell FC managers
Spanish expatriate football managers
Expatriate football managers in Switzerland
Expatriate football managers in Andorra
Spanish expatriate sportspeople in Andorra
FC Barcelona non-playing staff